The Yukon Public Library is a brick-and-mortar Colonial Revival structure located in Yukon, Oklahoma. It was the original public library for the city of Yukon, constructed in 1927 for $4,500 raised by the Yukon Ladies Library Club.

The club continued to financially support and operate the library until 1979, when the city of Yukon assumed responsibility. A new library was constructed and opened in 1980, and the old library building was used as a utility shed and storage. The Yukon Chamber of Commerce currently occupies the building.

It was designed by architects Sorey & Vahlberg of Oklahoma City.

References

Libraries on the National Register of Historic Places in Oklahoma
Library buildings completed in 1927
Canadian County, Oklahoma
Colonial Revival architecture in Oklahoma
National Register of Historic Places in Canadian County, Oklahoma